Seneferankhre Pepi III may have been a pharaoh of the 16th Dynasty during the Second Intermediate Period. According to Wolfgang Helck he was the fifth pharaoh of the dynasty. Alternatively, according to Jürgen von Beckerath, he was the thirteenth pharaoh of the dynasty. Because his position in the 16th Dynasty is highly uncertain, it is not clear who were his predecessor and successor.

Seneferankhre Pepi III is only attested by a scarab-shaped seal bearing his name. Egyptologist Kim Ryholt contests the seal as evidence that Pepi was a king of the 16th Dynasty, positing that the seal does not date to the Second Intermediate Period (SIP). According to Ryholt: "the size and design (prenomen + nomen without cartouche or royal titulary/epithets) of this seal is unparalleled during the SIP. Also the style of the signs is quite dissimilar to SIP seals." Instead, Ryholt proposes that the seal of Seneferankhre Pepi III be dated to the First Intermediate Period, noting however that this is a very early date for a scarab seal, since otherwise the earliest scarabs appear only with the reign of Senusret III of the late 12th Dynasty.

References 

17th-century BC Pharaohs
16th-century BC Pharaohs
Pharaohs of the Sixteenth Dynasty of Egypt